The Skin I'm In is a 2012 autobiographical documentary film that was produced, directed, shot, and edited by American filmmaker, scholar, and professor Broderick Fox. The film had its world premiere at the 2012 Byron Bay Film Festival and had its United States premiere at the Arizona International Film Festival, where it was awarded a Special Jury Award for Best Personal Filmmaking. The Skin I'm In will be released for stream and download on October 1, 2013 through The Orchard.

Cast 
Rande Cook
Broderick Fox
Zulu

Production 
Fox was inspired to create the film after an incident in 2005 where Fox was discovered on some subway tracks in the Berlin subway with head trauma and a blood alcohol level of 0.47. The incident prompted Fox to document his personal journey to explore himself, spirituality, and his art. The film was shot in five countries and includes collaborations with Canadian first nations artist Rande Cook and African-American artist Zulu to create a full back tattoo to memorialize the journey.

Reception 
The Times Colonist gave a favorable review for The Skin I'm In, praising Fox for his honesty in the film and stating that the collaboration with Cook and Zulu was one of the film's highlights.

Soundtrack 

The soundtrack for the film was composed by Ronit Kirchman. In order to assist her with the creation of the score, Kirchman was named a 2012 Sundance/Time Warner Fellow in film composition, which gave her some financial support towards the soundtrack's recording and performance. Kirchman later performed a live remix set of the score for The Skin I'm In as part of the 2012 Sundance Film Festival.

Track listing

References

External links 
 
 

2012 films
American documentary films
Documentary films about gay men
Autobiographical documentary films
2012 documentary films
2010s English-language films
2010s American films